WCCO (830 kHz) is a commercial AM radio station in Minneapolis, Minnesota, and owned by Audacy, Inc. Its studios and offices are located on Second Avenue South in Downtown Minneapolis. WCCO features a talk radio format, with frequent newscasts and sports programming.  Local hosts are heard most hours of the day and evening, including Chad Hartman, Vineeta Sawkar, Paul Douglas, Jordana Green and Adam Carter, Jason DeRusha, and Henry Lake.
Overnight, two syndicated shows are carried: Our American Stories with Lee Habeeb and America in the Morning with John Trout.  World and national news is supplied by CBS News Radio.  WCCO is the flagship radio station for the Minnesota Twins baseball team.

WCCO is a Class A clear-channel station. With 50,000 watts of power (the maximum permitted) and a nondirectional signal, WCCO reaches much of Minnesota and parts of Wisconsin and Iowa by day, along with a wide area of the Central United States and Central Canada at night. The transmitter is located off Coon Rapids Boulevard at Lily Street NW in Coon Rapids.  It is also heard on a digital subchannel on co-owned FM 102.9 KMNB-HD2.

History

Early years
WCCO first signed on the air on September 4, 1922, as WLAG, known as "the Call of the North".  The studios were in the Oak Grove Hotel near Loring Park in Minneapolis.  The station soon had financial trouble and closed in 1924. Washburn Crosby Company, forerunner of General Mills, took over the station and switched the call sign to WCCO for the company's initials. Broadcasts resumed less than two months later on October 2, 1924, from its current transmitter site in Coon Rapids, and with studios in the then-new Nicollet Hotel.

In 1927, WCCO was one of the original 21 stations of the NBC Red Network.  It carried NBC's slate of dramas, comedies, news, sports, soap operas, game shows, and big-band broadcasts during the "Golden Age of Radio". CBS bought WCCO from General Mills in 1932, and switched its network affiliation to the CBS Radio Network.  It remains a CBS affiliate.

1950s to the 1990s
In 1952, CBS sold majority control of WCCO to the Murphy and McNally families, who formed Midwest Radio and Television as a holding company for WCCO radio and its new co-owned television station, Channel 4 WCCO-TV. CBS was forced to sell off its stake in the WCCO stations in 1954 due to Federal Communications Commission ownership limits in effect at the time. CBS reacquired the WCCO stations outright in 1992 when Midwest Radio and Television merged with the network.

In the 1950s, as network programming was shifting from radio to television, WCCO switched to a full-service middle-of-the-road format, including popular music, news, sports, and talk. Robert Ridder became president of WCCO in 1952.

In the 1980s, the playlist shifted from middle-of-the-road music toward adult contemporary. The music was gradually phased out by the early 1990s, when the format was changed to news, talk, and sports.  From 1947 to 1996, WCCO and WCCO-TV won 12 George Foster Peabody Awards, more than any other Twin Cities broadcast outlet.

Signal and transmitter
In the early days of radio, WCCO was a powerful force in the development of better and more powerful transmitters. On November 11, 1928, with the implementation of the Federal Radio Commission's General Order 40, WCCO changed its frequency to 810 kHz and was granted clear-channel status.  It began broadcasting with 50,000 watts for the first time in September 1932. In the 1930s, two additional 300-foot towers were added to increase the range of the station's signal.

WCCO constructed a new 654-foot tower in Coon Rapids in 1939. This is the same tower used today, although the broadcast frequency was changed to 830 kHz as a result of the 1941 North American Regional Broadcasting Agreement-.

Due to the station's power, as well as Minnesota's mostly flat landscape (with near-perfect ground conductivity), WCCO boasts one of the largest coverage areas in the country.  During the day, it provides at least B-grade coverage to most of Minnesota's densely populated area (as far north as Duluth and as far south as Rochester), plus portions of northern Iowa and western Wisconsin.  Under the right conditions, it reaches into portions of South Dakota.

At night, the station's signal typically reaches across 28 U.S. states and three Canadian provinces. Certain conditions can make the signal reach much farther. Legendary station personality Howard Viken said that he once picked up the station while he was in the military during World War II, stationed at Guadalcanal in 1943.

Severe weather coverage
WCCO has a longtime reputation of being the station to tune in for emergency information, especially severe weather and school closings in winter. Listeners would call in during severe weather events and describe what they were seeing at their locations, supplementing information from the National Weather Service. For many years, WCCO was famous for its "klaxon" alert tone for tornado warnings. WCCO is also a PEP station for the Emergency Alert System.

For a series of live public-service emergency broadcasts in 1965 – the St. Patrick's Day blizzard, the record April floods on the Minnesota and Mississippi Rivers, and the May 6 onslaught of 24 tornado touchdowns in the Twin Cities area – the station earned the George Foster Peabody, DuPont, and Sigma Delta Chi awards.

FM: W9XHW to WCCO-FM to Lite-FM to BUZ'N/The Wolf

WCCO engineers were experimenting with frequency modulation by 1939, operating W9XHW at 42.3 MHz, but at just 50 watts.  With only a handful of Minneapolis residents owning an FM radio, WCCO did not rush into FM broadcasting.  As late as 1969, WCCO-FM was broadcasting at 2,700 watts atop the 450-foot Foshay Tower in downtown Minneapolis, and only for the minimum number of hours required to keep its FCC license.  Meanwhile, several local FM stations had already boosted their power to 100,000 watts and were airing new formats on FM, such as beautiful music and progressive rock.

Finally in 1973, WCCO-FM station moved its antenna to 1,250 feet near the top of the Shoreview, Minnesota, Twin Cities antenna farm, with a power of 100,000 watts. A full day's programming of music and a large news operation could be heard clearly for 150 miles in all directions. By the late 1970s, WCCO-FM 103 had come into its own and established an identity separate from AM 830, with a popular adult contemporary/soft rock sound.  In 1983, it became WLTE 102.9 Lite-FM, an identity it kept until Christmas 2011, when it switched to a country music format as BUZ'N @ 102.9 with the new call letters KMNB.

Changes in ratings
WCCO was the top-rated station in the Twin Cities for decades until shifting demographics and a decline in listening to AM radio caused a drop in the Arbitron and Nielsen ratings.  Several FM stations, including classic rock 92.5 KQRS-FM and Top 40 101.3 KDWB-FM were able to overtake it. One sign of the changing times: the well-known farm report was dropped in early 2004, reflecting the fact that many farmers began to rely more on the Internet for such information and that the number of farmers in Minnesota has drastically shrunk since the station first began broadcasting (although agriculture remains vital to the region).

In August 2008, as a cosmetic change to make WCCO in sync with other CBS talk radio stations, the station changed from "News/Talk 8•3•0 WCCO" to "News Radio 8•3•0 WCCO."  On September 15, 2011, WCCO was awarded the NAB Marconi Radio Award for Large Market Station of the Year.

Sports
WCCO became the radio home of Minnesota Timberwolves basketball team starting with the 2011–2012 season, acquiring the broadcast rights from rival AM 1130 KFAN.  WCCO started broadcasting University of St. Thomas football beginning in the 2011–2012 season. The St. Thomas football broadcasts would be caried on WCCO until the 2019-2020 season with no season in 2020 due to the COVID-19 pandemic. With the move to Division I starting in the 2021 season, the football games would move to KSTP. WCCO was the former home of University of Minnesota Golden Gophers athletics and Minnesota Wild hockey.  WCCO had been the radio flagship of the Minnesota Vikings football team from 1961 to 1969, 1976 to 1984, 1988 to 1990, and 1996 to 2000.

The Minnesota Twins had been heard on WCCO since arriving in the Twin Cities in 1961, but because of a dispute between WCCO parent company CBS and XM Satellite Radio over compensation for its Major League Baseball broadcasts, CBS did not renew many of its MLB contracts. The Twins would move to KSTP beginning in the 2007 season, and would then move to then-team owned KTWN-FM prior to the start of the 2013 season. On November 17, 2017, WCCO announced that Twins broadcasts would return to the station beginning in the 2018 season.

Entercom ownership
On February 2, 2017, CBS Radio agreed to merge with Entercom. The sale was conducted using a Reverse Morris Trust to shield the deal from taxes. While CBS shareholders retain a 72% ownership stake in the combined company, Entercom was the surviving entity, with WCCO Radio no longer being co-owned with WCCO-TV. The merger was approved on November 9, 2017, and was consummated on the 17th.

In 2018, WCCO returned to the moniker "News/Talk 8•3•0 WCCO" with its logo reflecting the change.

Past personalities

WCCO broadcasters were known across the Midwest. Perhaps the greatest of them all was Cedric Adams, who first was heard on WCCO in 1931, and broadcast on the station until his death in 1961. Pilots flying over the Upper Midwest reported watching the lights go out all over the region each night when Adams finished his 10 pm newscast.  Howard Viken, Maynard Speece, Charlie Boone and Roger Erickson, Jergen Nash, Joyce Lamont, and Randy Merriman became household names.  When broadcaster Steve Cannon "the Iron Ranger" (who referred to WCCO as 'The evil neighbor') and his cast of characters arrived at WCCO from AM 1500 KSTP in 1971, he was still thought of by many as the "new guy" nearly until his retirement 26 years later.

For several years, WCCO has hosted a weekly radio show with the governor of Minnesota. Former Governor Jesse Ventura had a show while in office, and successor Tim Pawlenty followed suit. 
Eleanor Mondale, the daughter of former Senator and Vice President Walter Mondale, started her career in radio at the station in 1989 as the entertainment reporter, but left after 8 months. She returned to Minnesota in 2006 to co-host a weekday morning show on WCCO with Susie Jones.

More recent WCCO personalities have included longtime Star Tribune columnist Sid Hartman, "Whole-Lotta Woman" Ruth Koscielak and Tim Russell, who had been a cast member on Garrison Keillor's A Prairie Home Companion, heard on NPR for many years. Some notable sports broadcasters have included Baseball Hall of Fame member Herb Carneal, the longtime voice of the Minnesota Twins, Halsey Hall, Ray Scott and Ray Christensen, longtime voice of University of Minnesota's Gopher football and Gopher men's basketball.

AM stereo history
After nearly a year of work to outfit the station and prepare programming in stereo, on October 2, 1985, WCCO began broadcasting in AM stereo using the Motorola C-QUAM system. The move by the large market dominating WCCO to adopt AM stereo received attention from local and national news outlets. WCCO discontinued broadcasting in AM stereo around the turn of the millennium.

HD Radio
In 2005, WCCO began broadcasting its signal in the HD Radio format.  WCCO programming is also simulcast on 102.9 KMNB-HD2.  In March 2018, WCCO shut down its HD Radio signal on AM 830.

References

 (2001).  Radio and Television.  A History of Minneapolis.  Minneapolis Public Library.  Accessed November 15, 2018.
 History of WCCO Tower. City of Coon Rapids.  Accessed September 25, 2004.

External links
FCC History Cards for WCCO
 
 
 Radiotapes.com Historic airchecks of WCCO-AM and other Twin Cities radio stations dating back to 1924.
 TwinCitiesRadioAirchecks.com Airchecks of Twin Cities stations from the 1960s and 1970s.
The First Forty - The Story of WCCO Radio 1924-1964

Radio stations in Minneapolis–Saint Paul
Peabody Award winners
News and talk radio stations in the United States
Radio stations established in 1922
1922 establishments in Minnesota
Audacy, Inc. radio stations
General Mills
Clear-channel radio stations
Radio stations licensed before 1923 and still broadcasting